134 may refer to:

134 (number)
AD 134
134 BC
134 (MBTA bus)
134 (New Jersey bus)